True Love is a 2012 romantic-themed psychological thriller film directed by Enrico Clerico Nasino and starring John Brotherton and Ellen Hollman.

Premise
Right after their marriage, lovebirds Jack and Kate mysteriously wake up in separate cells from which they cannot escape. Instead they are forced to watch CCTV videos which reveal the other's dirty secrets, and answer yes-no questions about their trust for their partner.

Cast
John Brotherton as Jack Reilly
Ellen Hollman as Kate Sunderland
Gabriel Myers as Eric Drake a.k.a. Mark Weinstock, Kate's lover
Jay Harrington as Sam, Jack's friend
Clare Carey as Dana, Kate's friend
Tyrees Allen as Jack's therapist
Rand Holdren as Kevin, a playboy
Mick Lea

Reception
Twitch Film'''s Shelagh Rowan-Legg gave a generally positive review, writing that the set design makes audiences "squirm in their seats". Carole Jahme of The Guardian'' called the film "a letdown" and criticised both the script and performances.

References

External links

English-language Italian films
Films set in Los Angeles
American psychological thriller films
Italian romance films
American romance films
2010s romance films
2010s English-language films
2010s American films